Dashiv is an urban-type settlement in Haisyn Raion of Vinnytsia Oblast in Ukraine. It is located on the banks of the Sob, a left tributary of the Southern Bug. Dashiv hosts the administration of Dashiv settlement hromada, one of the hromadas of Ukraine. Population: 

Until 18 July 2020, Dashiv belonged to Illintsi Raion. The raion was abolished in July 2020 as part of the administrative reform of Ukraine, which reduced the number of raions of Vinnytsia Oblast to six. The area of Illintsi Raion was split between Haisyn and Vinnytsia Raions, with Dashiv being transferred to Haisyn Raion.

Economy

Transportation
The closest railway stations are in Haisyn and in Kryshtopivka, bith on the railway line connecting Vinnytsia with Khrystynivka and Vapniarka. There is infrequent passenger traffic.

The settlement is connected by road with to Haisyn and Vinnytsia, where it has access to Highway M30 connecting Stryi and Dnipro.

References

Urban-type settlements in Haisyn Raion